Anriel Howard (born May 6, 1997) is a former American professional basketball player who played one season in the WNBA. She currently is a professional wrestler signed to WWE where she performs on its NXT brand under the ring name Lash Legend.

College career
Howard came out of high school as the 100th rated recruit of the 2015 Class per ESPN's HoopGurlz rankings. Shew was also rated the 15th best forward at her position. Howard committed to play for Texas A&M. She played for them for three seasons before she transferred to Mississippi State for her senior season.

During her time at Texas A&M, Howard was rebounding machine.  Howard was the first player in Texas A&M history to have over 1,000 career rebounds with the school, getting 1,002 rebounds. She also set an NCAA Tournament record with 27 rebounds in a 2016 NCAA tournament game. She was named to the SEC All-Freshman team during her first year with the Aggies.

Howard announced she was going to transfer following her junior season, and ultimately chose to go to Mississippi State. Howard stated, “As soon as I landed I felt like it was the place...In high school when I was recruited, I just felt like Texas A&M was the place for me on my visit. Usually when I go on a visit there’s something that I question, but I just never got that feeling and that was the first time ever."

She was named to the 2019 First Team All-SEC by both the AP and Coaches, 2019 SEC All-Tournament Team, and to the 2019 AP All-American Honorable Mention team during her one season with the Bulldogs.

WNBA

Seattle Storm
In the 2019 WNBA Draft, Howard was taken 24th overall by the Seattle Storm. After debuting against the Minnesota Lynx on May 29, Howard played a total of three games with the Storm. She notched five points and three rebounds over a total of 23 minutes, before she was waived from the team early in the season.

WNBA career statistics

Regular season

|-
| align="left" | 2019
| align="left" | Seattle
| 3 || 0 || 6.7 || .400 || .500 || .000 || 1.0 || 0.0 || 0.3 || 0.0 || 0.7 || 1.7
|-
| align="left" | Career
| align="left" | 1 year, 1 team
| 3 || 0 || 6.7 || .400 || .500 || .000 || 1.0 || 0.0 || 0.3 || 0.0 || 0.7 || 1.7

Professional wrestling career 

Howard signed with WWE on December 2, 2020. On the September 21, 2021, episode of NXT, Howard made her televised debut during a backstage segment with Franky Monet, presenting herself as Lash Legend. On the September 28 episode of NXT, Legend began being regularly featured as host a pre-taped talk show segment, Lashing Out with Lash Legend. On the December 10 episode of 205 Live, Howard made her in-ring debut, defeating Amari Miller and establishing herself as a heel.

References

External links
WNBA bio
 Mississippi State Lady Bulldogs bio
 Texas A&M Aggies bio

1997 births
Living people
21st-century professional wrestlers
Sportspeople from Atlanta
American female professional wrestlers
American women's basketball players
Forwards (basketball)
Texas A&M Aggies women's basketball players
Texas A&M Aggies women's track and field athletes
Mississippi State Bulldogs women's basketball players
Basketball players from Atlanta
Track and field athletes from Atlanta
Professional wrestlers from Georgia (U.S. state)
Seattle Storm players
Seattle Storm draft picks